Franco Lavoratori (15 March 1941 – 3 May 2006) was an Italian water polo player. He competed at the 1960, 1964, 1968 and 1972 Olympics and finished in first, fourth, fourth and sixth place; he scored four, zero, six and three goals, respectively. Between 1959 and 1974, he won 14 Italian titles, as well as one domestic cup in 1974 and one European Cup in 1965.

See also
 Italy men's Olympic water polo team records and statistics
 List of Olympic champions in men's water polo
 List of Olympic medalists in water polo (men)
 List of players who have appeared in multiple men's Olympic water polo tournaments

References

External links

 

1941 births
2006 deaths
Italian male water polo players
Water polo players at the 1960 Summer Olympics
Water polo players at the 1964 Summer Olympics
Water polo players at the 1968 Summer Olympics
Water polo players at the 1972 Summer Olympics
Olympic gold medalists for Italy in water polo
Medalists at the 1960 Summer Olympics
Sportspeople from the Province of Genoa
20th-century Italian people
21st-century Italian people